Temperamental is the tenth studio album by British musical duo Everything but the Girl. It was released on 27 September 1999 by Atlantic Records in the United States and Virgin Records in Europe.

By the end of 1999, Temperamental had sold 115,000 copies in the United States, according to Billboard. It sold over 500,000 copies worldwide and was met with success in the dance market. "The Future of the Future (Stay Gold)" (US Dance No. 1, UK No. 31), "Five Fathoms" (US Dance No. 1, No. UK No. 27), "Blame", "Temperamental" (US Dance No. 1, UK No. 72) and "Lullaby of Clubland" (US Dance No. 3) were released as singles.

Temperamental was reissued by Edsel Records as a two-disc deluxe set on 4 September 2015.

Background
Tracey Thorn and Ben Watt recorded Temperamental in the immediate period following the birth of their twin daughters in 1998. Due to Thorn's preoccupation with motherhood, her level of involvement in the creation of the album was scaled back, with Watt taking on a more prominent role in writing lyrics and music. Thorn recorded most of her vocals during late-night studio sessions, after the twins had gone to sleep. In her autobiography Bedsit Disco Queen (2013), she remarked that "in a sense, [she] ended up being guest vocalist on someone else's album".

Composition
According to AllMusic critic Stephen Thomas Erlewine, Temperamental was a continuation of the musical direction pursued by Everything but the Girl on their previous album Walking Wounded (1996), merging electronica with elements of folk, jazz and pop. He described the musical style of Temperamental as a minor refinement of that of Walking Wounded, eschewing its drum and bass and trip hop influences in favour of a more house-driven sound. Salon writer Amanda Nowinski wrote that Temperamental retained drum and bass breakbeats but was mostly informed by "old-school" garage house, while NME characterised the album as "a left-turn into deep house ambience and trip-hop grooves" that is "punctuated by vulnerable lyrics and vocal performances" from Tracey Thorn. Michael White of The Quietus viewed it as "an aesthetic continuation of [Walking Wounded], synthesizing the most recent developments of clubland with the duo's intrinsic song-based approach". Ben Watt incorporated production techniques that he had learned from his three years as a resident DJ at Bar Rumba and Notting Hill Arts Club into the album's songs, including cross-fading, back spinning, and filtering. This reliance on dance music is notable on the album's first single, "The Future of the Future (Stay Gold)", that features Deep Dish and is composed upon a sample of the band's 1996 single "Stay Gold".

Stephen Thomas Erlewine observed that the songs on Temperamental "are essentially in the singer/songwriter vein" and described the album as a whole as "more of a meditative, reflective piece", while also observing a relative lack of pop hooks compared to Walking Wounded. Michael White noted the contrast between the "swaggering urban rhythms" of the music and the deeply introspective nature of the lyrics. "It's not as poppy as Walking Wounded," Tracey Thorn would later remark, while attributing the album's darker and less accessible nature to the circumstances surrounding its creation: "It's like going back to Amplified Heart: you can tell it's made by people who are in a stage of turmoil and change again." Thorn, composing lyrics for Temperamental, found herself unable to articulate her feelings about motherhood and other significant changes occurring in her life at the time, and as a result she instead opted to write from a non-autobiographical standpoint.

Track listing

2015 Edsel Records reissue

Personnel
Credits for Temperamental adapted from liner notes.

Everything but the Girl
 Tracey Thorn – vocals
 Ben Watt – bass, guitars, keyboards, strings, beats, scratching, sound editing and programming, mixing, production

Production
 Andy Bradfield – mixing, vocal production on "The Future of the Future (Stay Gold)"
 Ricky Graham – assistant mixing
 Geoff Pesche – mastering
 J Majik – additional production on "Blame"
 Danny Jay – additional production on "Blame"
 Deep Dish – mixing, programming, production on "The Future of the Future (Stay Gold)"

Design
 Dolphin Trax – design
 CJ Field – artwork coordination
 Graham Rounthwaite – cover illustration

Charts

References

1999 albums
Atlantic Records albums
Everything but the Girl albums
Virgin Records albums
House music albums by English artists
Drum and bass albums